Different Seasons (1982) is a collection of four Stephen King novellas with a more dramatic bent, rather than the horror fiction for which King is famous. The four novellas are tied together via subtitles that relate to each of the four seasons. The collection is notable for having nearly all of its novellas turned into Hollywood films, one of which, The Shawshank Redemption, was nominated for the 1994 Academy Award for Best Picture.

Novellas

Title
At the ending of the book, there is also a brief afterword, which King wrote on January 4, 1982. In it, he explains why he had not previously submitted the novellas (each written at a different time) for publication. Early in his career, his agents and editors expressed concern that he would be "written off" as someone who only wrote horror. However, his horror novels turned out to be quite popular and made him much in demand as a novelist. Conversely, the novellas, which did not deal (primarily) with the supernatural, were very difficult to publish as there was not a mass market for "straight" fiction stories in the 25,000- to 35,000-word format. Thus, King and his editor conceived the idea of publishing the novellas together as "something different", hence the title of the book.

See also

1982 in literature
Stephen King short fiction bibliography

References

1982 short story collections
American short story collections
Books with cover art by Kinuko Y. Craft
Short story collections by Stephen King
Viking Press books